Paul Joseph Weitz (July 25, 1932 – October 22, 2017) was an American naval officer and aviator, aeronautical engineer, test pilot, and NASA astronaut, who flew into space twice. He was a member of the three-man crew who flew on Skylab 2, the first crewed Skylab mission. He was also commander of the STS-6 mission, the maiden flight of the Space Shuttle Challenger.

Biography
Paul J. Weitz was born in 1932 in Erie, Pennsylvania, United States.  He went on to complete a master's degree in engineering and was a pilot in the Navy. He went on to be an astronaut that went in to space aboard Skylab and the Space Shuttle, later serving as a NASA official.

Early years and education
Weitz was born in Erie, Pennsylvania, on July 25, 1932. After attending McKinley Elementary School, he graduated from Harbor Creek High School in Harborcreek, Pennsylvania, in 1949 as Valedictorian. The high school stadium was later named after him. He received a Bachelor of Science degree in Aeronautical Engineering from Pennsylvania State University in 1954. While attending Penn State, he was a member of the Alpha Upsilon Chapter of Beta Theta Pi. Ten years later, he received a Master of Science degree in Aeronautical Engineering from the U.S. Naval Postgraduate School in Monterey, California.

Flight experience
Weitz received his commission as an Ensign through the Naval ROTC program at Penn State. He served for one year at sea aboard a destroyer before going to flight training and was awarded his aviator wings in September 1956. He served in various naval aircraft squadrons until he was selected as an astronaut in 1966. He logged more than 7,700 hours flying time—6,400 hours in jet aircraft.

NASA career

In April 1966, Weitz was one of 19 men selected by NASA for Astronaut Group 5. He served as pilot on the crew of Skylab 2 (SL-2), which launched on May 25 and splashed down on June 22, 1973. SL-2 was the first crewed Skylab mission. The mission lasted for 28 days, a record at the time. Weitz and his two crewmates, Pete Conrad and Joseph P. Kerwin, performed extensive and unprecedented repairs to serious damage that Skylab sustained during its uncrewed launch, salvaging the entire Skylab mission. Weitz logged two hours and 11 minutes of EVA during the mission. If NASA followed typical crew rotations, Weitz may have been assigned as the Command Module Pilot for the canceled Apollo 20 mission.

In 1976 Weitz retired from NASA and went back to the Navy, but he returned to NASA to fly the maiden spaceflight of the Challenger at over 50 years old.

Weitz was spacecraft commander on the crew of STS-6, which launched from Kennedy Space Center, Florida, on April 4, 1983. This was the maiden voyage of the orbiter Challenger. During the mission, the crew conducted numerous experiments in materials processing, recorded lightning activities, deployed IUS/TDRS-A, conducted extravehicular activity while testing a variety of support systems and equipment in preparation for future spacewalks, and also carried three Getaway Specials. Mission duration was 120 hours before Challenger landed on a concrete runway at Edwards Air Force Base, California, on April 9, 1983. With the completion of this flight, Weitz logged a total of 793 hours in space.

Weitz was Deputy Director of the Johnson Space Center when he retired from NASA in May 1994.

Personal life and death
Weitz married the former Suzanne M. Berry of Harborcreek, Pennsylvania. They had two children — Matthew, and Cynthia.

Hunting and fishing were among his hobbies.

After retiring, Weitz lived in Arizona until his death on October 22, 2017, from myelodysplastic syndrome at the age of 85.

Organizations
 Fellow, American Astronautical Society
 Master Mason, Lawrence Lodge 708, Erie, Pennsylvania

Awards and honors
Awarded the: 
 Navy Astronaut Wings
 Navy Distinguished Service Medal
 Air Medal (5)
 Navy Commendation Medal (for combat flights in Vietnam)
 NASA Distinguished Service Medal
 NASA Space Flight Medal
 Los Angeles Chamber of Commerce Kitty Hawk Award (1973)
 Pennsylvania State University Alumni Association's Distinguished Alumni Award
 Named a Pennsylvania State University Alumni Fellow (1974)
 AIAA Haley Astronautics Award for 1974
 Fédération Aéronautique Internationale's V. M. Komarov Diploma for 1973 (1974)
 1974 Harmon International Aviation Trophy for Astronaut (1975)
 1984 Harmon International Award (1989)

The three Skylab astronaut crews were awarded the 1973 Robert J. Collier Trophy "For proving beyond question the value of man in future explorations of space and the production of data of benefit to all the people on Earth."  Gerald Carr accepted the 1975 Dr. Robert H. Goddard Memorial Trophy from President Ford, awarded to the Skylab astronauts. He was one of 24 Apollo astronauts who were inducted into the U.S. Astronaut Hall of Fame in 1997.

See also 

 Delaware lunar sample displays
 The Astronaut Monument

References

External links

Astronautix biography of Paul J. Weitz
Spacefacts biography of Paul J. Weitz
Weitz at Spaceacts 
Weitz at Encyclopedia of Science

1932 births
2017 deaths
Deaths from myelodysplastic syndrome
1973 in spaceflight
1983 in spaceflight
United States Navy astronauts
NASA civilian astronauts
Apollo program astronauts
United States Astronaut Hall of Fame inductees
People from Erie, Pennsylvania
American Freemasons
American aerospace engineers
Penn State College of Engineering alumni
Naval Postgraduate School alumni
United States Navy officers
Aviators from Pennsylvania
United States Naval Aviators
United States Navy personnel of the Vietnam War
Military personnel from Pennsylvania
NASA people
Recipients of the Navy Distinguished Service Medal
Recipients of the Air Medal
Recipients of the NASA Distinguished Service Medal
Collier Trophy recipients
Harmon Trophy winners
American people of German descent
Engineers from Pennsylvania
Space Shuttle program astronauts
Skylab program astronauts
Spacewalkers